Mallotus fuscescens is a species of plant in the family Euphorbiaceae. It is endemic to Sri Lanka.

References

fuscescens
Endemic flora of Sri Lanka
Vulnerable flora of Asia
Taxonomy articles created by Polbot